Dmitriyevsky (masculine), Dmitriyevskaya (feminine), or Dmitriyevskoye (neuter) may refer to:
Dmitriyevsky District, a district of Kursk Oblast, Russia
Dmitriyevsky (rural locality) (Dmitriyevskaya, Dmitriyevskoye), name of several rural localities in Russia